Oraniopsis is a monotypic genus of flowering plant in the palm family from Queensland, Australia, where the only known species, Oraniopsis appendiculata, grows in mountainous rain forest.  Dioecious and extremely slow growing, the name means "similar to Orania" and the Latin epithet translates to "appendaged".

Description 
Oraniopsis appendiculata trunks are gray, solitary, from 30 to 45 cm wide, usually reaching to 6 m in height, though mature individuals in habitat can reach up to 18 m.  It may be, however, 20 or 30 years before an emergent trunk develops.  In juvenile life the plant is a ground-level rosette of 3 – 4 m pinnate leaves on short, wide petioles.  In dense forests with little light they may be ground rosettes for up to 60 years, and in these conditions the leaf, stretching for sunlight, may elongate to 8 m.  The pinnae are deep green above, glaucous below, regularly arranged with one fold. Once trunk forming, the leaf crown is feather-duster shaped, rarely hemispherical, the stiff leaves upward pointing, and usually persistent after dying, forming a skirt around the trunk.

The inflorescence emerges in the leaf crown and is shorter than the leaves, to 75 cm, with superficially similar male and female flowers on separate plants.  From one carpel, the fruit ripens to yellow or orange with one seed.

Seed germination is a lengthy process, to a year or more, with some seeds resisting germination to four years.  On sprouting, the plant is invariably slow-moving, failing to show trunk height for multiple decades.  Unless the rate of growth markedly increases in later life, the biggest specimens in Queensland are probably several hundred years old.

Despite bearing resemblance to their namesake, this plant is most closely related to the South American palm Ceroxylon, differing only in the amount of peduncular bracts, the bracteole flowers, and the free, rather than basally fused, petals.

Distribution and habitat
Found in the Australian rain forest between the Tully River area, down to the Big Tableland south of Cooktown, and as far inland as the Great Dividing Range southwest of Atherton.  Mostly from 300 to 1500 m, they may be found on rocky hillsides and coastal sands but are most common in rainy, cloudy forests.  They often grow in rich organic soil or basaltic medium, but are absent from deep soil and open plains.

References

External links
 GBIF Portal
 Oraniopsis on NPGS/GRIN
 Fairchild Guide to Palms: Oraniopsis
 Images
 Kew Plant List
 IPNI Listing

Palms of Australia
Trees of Australia
Ceroxyloideae
Flora of Queensland
Monotypic Arecaceae genera
Taxa named by Odoardo Beccari
Dioecious plants